Dorothy Maynor (September 3, 1910 – February 19, 1996) was an American soprano, concert singer, and the founder of the Harlem School of the Arts.

Early life
Maynor was born Dorothy Leigh Mainor in 1910 in the town of Norfolk, Virginia to the Reverend John J. Mainor, a local African-American Methodist minister and his wife Alice (Jefferson) Mainor.

Dorothy attended Hampton Institute where she studied under R. Nathaniel Dett. After her graduation from the Institute in 1933 she received a four-year scholarship to the Westminster Choir School in Princeton, New Jersey.

Career

In 1939, she performed at the Berkshire Festival where she was noticed by Sergei Koussevitzky, conductor of the Boston Symphony Orchestra. Impressed by her singing, he arranged her debut at The Town Hall in New York City on 9 December 1939. She received the Town Hall Endowment Series Award for 1940 as a result of this performance. In New York, she was taught by voice instructors William Clamroth and John Alan Haughton. Despite the fact that racism precluded her from performing in opera houses, Maynor toured extensively throughout the USA, Europe, and Latin America, performing in concert halls and frequently on the radio.

She is noted as the first African American to sing at a presidential inauguration, performing at President Harry S. Truman's inaugural gala in 1949 and at President Dwight D. Eisenhower's 1953 presidential inauguration at Constitution Hall, where the Daughters of the American Revolution famously refused to let Marian Anderson sing in 1939. Though many maintain that Anderson's performance at Eisenhower's 1957 inauguration broke color barriers, Maynor's performances have received comparably less attention, despite predating Anderson by eight years.

In 1949 she was featured in an episode of Richard Durham's radio drama Destination Freedom, with Charmaine Anderson playing her character.

In 1964, she founded the Harlem School of the Arts which was designed to give music education at a reduced rate to the children of Harlem. Under Maynor's directorship the school grew from 20 students to 1,000 by the time of her retirement in 1979. She received honorary degrees from several universities including Westminster Choir College, Oberlin College, The Hartt School of Music (University of Hartford), and two degrees from Howard University. In 1975, she became the first African-American on the board of directors of the Metropolitan Opera. She died on 19 February 1996 in West Chester, Pennsylvania.

Personal life

In 1942, she married Reverend Shelby Rooks, the pastor of Harlem's St. James Presbyterian Church where the Harlem School of the Arts was originally located. After her retirement from the School, Maynor moved to Kennett Square, Pennsylvania with her husband.

References

American Presbyterians
Singers from Virginia
1910 births
1996 deaths
20th-century African-American women singers